Drumsurn is a small village and townland in County Londonderry, Northern Ireland. It lies in the Roe Valley, at the foot of Donald's Hill and at the edge of the Sperrins. Drumsurn had a population of 357 people in the 2001 Census. It is situated within Causeway Coast and Glens district.

The Troubles in Drumsurn
During the Troubles, loyalist paramilitaries exploded a car bomb outside O’Connor's Supply House in the centre of the village on 26 July 1973. There was considerable damage but no casualties.

Sport
 Drumsurn GAC is the local Gaelic Athletic Association club.

Transport
 Drumsurn railway station opened on 4 July 1883, closed for passenger traffic on 1 January 1933 and finally closed altogether on 3 July 1950.

Gallery

References 

Villages in County Londonderry
Causeway Coast and Glens district